The 2016 presidential campaign of Emidio "Mimi" Soltysik, an activist from Los Angeles, California, began with his announcement of candidacy on October 17, 2015. He was formally nominated by the Socialist Party USA for President at their November 2015 convention in Milwaukee, Wisconsin. His running-mate was Angela Nicole Walker, a bus driver and labor organizer from Milwaukee, Wisconsin. The campaign was on the ballot in two states (Colorado and Michigan) as well as in the U.S. overseas territory of Guam, which has no electoral votes. It earned 4,061 total votes.

Background
Soltysik served as co-chair of the Socialist Party USA prior to his nomination for president. He also ran for State Representative in 2014. Walker, who is a labor organizer and school bus driver, ran for sheriff of Milwaukee County, Wisconsin in 2014 as an independent socialist. She won 21% of the vote against Fox News pundit and Democrat David Clarke.

Campaign
The Soltysik-Walker campaign has been covered by the Los Angeles Times, CNBC, Vice, Wired.it, the Independent Voter Network, The North Star, The Hampton Institute and Cracked.com.

Soltysik has made campaign stops in Denver and Philadelphia, Indianapolis, Lancaster, Pennsylvania, Ann Arbor, Michigan, Flint, Michigan among other places. The focus of these events was on meeting community activists and building local networks of community activists.

Ballot access
In June, the campaign filed for ballot access in the state of Illinois. Under Illinois law, 25,000 valid signatures are required to secure ballot access for independent and non-qualified alternative parties. However, this requirement is only enforced if a petition's validity is challenged by an Illinois voter. The Soltysik-Walker campaign, which submitted one signature, was challenged by "dissident" Green Party member Rob Sherman, who had also challenged the Socialist Party, Constitution Party and Justice Party petitions in 2012. Because the Soltysik campaign was found to have an insufficient number of signatures, it was removed from the Illinois ballot.

On July 28, the Michigan chapter of the Natural Law Party nominated Soltysik-Walker and gave the ticket its first ballot line in 2016.

On August 9, the campaign announced that it would be on the ballot in Colorado with the ballot label Socialist Party USA.

In September, the campaign became the only alternative party to be listed on the ballot in Guam.

Results
Voters in the straw poll in Guam gave Soltysik/Walker 4.22% of the vote.

Soltysik/Walker finished in seventh place with 2,209 votes in Michigan, behind other balloted candidates and write-in Evan McMullin. The ticket earned 271 votes in Colorado, 21st place out of a crowded field of 22 on the ballot. Overall, the campaign received 2,693 votes including write-ins.

Endorsements
 Anarcha-transfeminism
 Red Party
 Red Philly
 Socialist Action

See also
 Stewart Alexander presidential campaign, 2012
 Brian Moore presidential campaign, 2008

References

Socialist
2016